The Millennium Bridge is a pedestrian bridge spanning the River Liffey in Dublin, Ireland, joining Eustace Street in Temple Bar to the north quays.

The bridge was installed in December 1999 to commemorate the approaching new millennium in 2000. It was prefabricated in Carlow, 80 km from Dublin, as a portal frame structure made up of a slender steel truss and resting on reinforced concrete haunches.

The bridge was designed by Howley Harrington Architects, with Price & Myers as consulting engineers. The concrete base and steel structure for the bridge were provided by two firms from Carlow: Formwork 2000+ and Thompson Engineering respectively.

The Millennium Bridge is neighbour to the much older pedestrian Ha'penny Bridge to the east, and Grattan Bridge to the west.

References

Bridges in Dublin (city)
Buildings and structures celebrating the third millennium
Pedestrian bridges in the Republic of Ireland
Bridges completed in 1999
1999 establishments in Ireland